Shahr-e Naw, also spelled Share Naw, Shahre Naow or Shari Naw, is an affluent neighborhood in the northwestern section of Kabul, Afghanistan. It is a downtown commercial area housing most of the bigger buildings such as office centers, shopping centers, education centers, embassies, supermarkets, hotels, banks, hospitals, mosques, and apartments. To its west lies Karte Sakhi, and to its east is the affluent Wazir Akbar Khan neighborhood. Its name in a general sense means New Town, which is taken as it was first built in the early 20th century as a 'new' urban extension north of the historic city of Kabul.

Economy
Ariana Afghan Airlines's corporate headquarters are in Shahr-e Naw. Kam Air has a ticketing office in the Kabul Business Centre in Shāre Naw. At one time the facility housed the airline's head office. Safi Airways also had its head office in Shahr-e Naw.

Government and infrastructure

Arg, which is the former presidential palace of Afghanistan, is located in the southeastern part of Shahr-e Naw. The Shahr-e Naw Park is located in the northwestern part. The Kabul Serena Hotel, Jamhuriat Hospital, Abdul Rahman Mosque are also in Shahr-e Naw.

Education
The Lycee Esteqlal is located in Shahr-e Naw. The Deutsche Schule Kabul was also there.

Postal code
The area's government postal code is 1003.

References

External links

Neighborhoods of Kabul